The 1992 New York Jets season was the 33rd season for the team and the 23rd in the National Football League. The Jets were looking to improve on their 8–8 record under head coach Bruce Coslet in 1991 and also make a second consecutive trip to the postseason. However, it was not to be.

Background
The Jets' problems began in the offseason when veteran quarterback Ken O'Brien announced he was holding out of training camp to get a new contract. O'Brien’s holdout continued into the season and Coslet named second-year backup Browning Nagle as the team's starter. Nagle did not have an effective year, only winning three of his thirteen starts. He was eventually replaced by O'Brien late in the year, but was pressed back into action after the veteran suffered a season-ending injury. The Jets didn't win a game until Week 5 against the New England Patriots and only won three more times the rest of the year to finish with a 4–12 record. Two of those wins came against division rivals, the eventual AFC Champion Buffalo Bills and the AFC East winner and conference runner up Miami Dolphins.

In addition to O'Brien’s injury, the Jets saw three of their starters lost to catastrophic injuries. In Week 2 defensive end Jeff Lageman, who had been a defensive star for the Jets during their 1991 playoff push, went down with a season-ending injury. Then, in a Week 10 loss to the Denver Broncos, star receiver Al Toon suffered a concussion. It was his ninth in eight seasons as a professional, and on the morning following the game Toon announced his immediate retirement due to the accumulation of concussions during his career.

Dennis Byrd
Finally, in a Week 13 loss to the Kansas City Chiefs at home, another major injury befell the Jets. During a Chiefs offensive series, Byrd advanced on quarterback Dave Krieg and was attempting to sack him. As he was doing this, his teammate Scott Mersereau was approaching from the other side of the formation. Byrd reached Krieg first and was able to strip the ball from him, forcing a fumble. A second later, Byrd collided with Mersereau, whom he did not see approaching, hitting him in the chest with the crown of his helmet. The collision broke the C5 vertebrae in Byrd’s neck, leaving him paralyzed. 

The Jets wore a decal on their helmets for the rest of the season with Byrd's #90 surrounding an ichthys. With Byrd's injury still fresh in their minds the Jets went to Buffalo for their Week 14 matchup with the Bills and defeated them for their fourth and last win of the season. 

Byrd began undergoing an aggressive physical therapy regimen and would eventually regain the ability to walk. He returned to Giants Stadium as an honorary captain for the team’s home opener the following season. His jersey number was never issued again by the Jets, but was not officially retired until 2012. 

After the season, Jets star running back Freeman McNeil announced his retirement. At the time of his retirement he was the all-time leading rusher in Jets history, but he has since been surpassed by Curtis Martin.

Offseason

NFL Draft

Personnel

Staff

Roster

Regular season

Schedule

Standings

External links
1992 statistics

References

New York Jets seasons
New York Jets
New York Jets season
20th century in East Rutherford, New Jersey
Meadowlands Sports Complex